Chiliwist Creek is a stream in the U.S. state of Washington.

Chiliwist Creek was named after Charley Chiliwist, a pioneer settler of Native American descent.

See also
List of rivers of Washington

References

Rivers of Okanogan County, Washington
Rivers of Washington (state)